"You, Too, Can Have a Body" is a 1960 Australian television play that screened as part of The General Motors Hour.

It was based on a play which had been performed on stage and television in England. It was shot in the GTV 9 Studios in Melbourne.

Plot
Two television scriptwriters—Chick Weld (Bill Maynnrd) and Lucky Wilson (Mark Kelly) — accept an invitation from Lord Leverdale to stay at the haunted Creckwood Castle. The castle is haunted by The Black Monk, who was tortured to death in 1305 for practising magic. The two script writers work on a television play as mysterious goings on happen at the castle.

Cast
 Bill Maynard as Chick Wade
 Campbell Copelin as Lord Loverdale
 Mark Kelly as Chick Wade's assistant
 Diana Bell as Maud Tarrant
 Ivan Vander
 John Morgan
 Melissa Jaffer
 Mary Ward
 Lyn Rowe
 Godfrey Philipp

Production
The play was based on a British play by Fred Robinson which was first performed in England in 1958. The cast was headed by Bill Maynard who subsequently moved to Australia where he repeated his stage performance in the TV play. Robinson later wrote The Larkins.

Mark Kelly played the role played in London by Australian actor Bill Kerr. The production was taped on 24 July 1960 at GTV 9 Studios in Melbourne for simultaneous broadcast in Sydney and Melbourne. Except for a few cuts it was substantially the same as that presented at Victoria Palace between June and September 1958. Rod Kinner said he felt Maynard was more a "comedy actor than a comedian.

ReceptionThe Age said "it did have a few good laughs and was a useful vehicle" for Maynard.

In 1967 Agnes Harrison reviewed the first decade of Melbourne television and said Body'' was the "least 'worthy'" of dramas made in Melbourne but said "this slap-happy play achieved something in showing off the throw-away comedy talents of its producer-star, Englishman Bill Maynard, of happy memory."

References

External links
 

1960s Australian television plays
1960 television plays
1960 Australian television episodes
The General Motors Hour